Irina Molicheva (born 12 November 1988) is a road cyclist from Russia. She participated at the 2012 UCI Road World Championships in the Women's team time trial.

Career results
2010
3rd Team Pursuit, UEC European U23 Championships, (Alfiya Khabibulina and Elena Lichmanova)
2014
Memorial of Alexander Lesnikov
1st Scratch Race
3rd Individual Pursuit
2nd  Team pursuit, UEC European Track Championships (with Tamara Balabolina, Alexandra Chekina, Aleksandra Goncharova and Evgenia Romanyuta)

References

External links
 profile at Procyclingstats.com

1988 births
Russian female cyclists
Living people
Place of birth missing (living people)